Corey Thomas may refer to:
 Corey Thomas (American football)
 Corey Thomas (rugby union)